Anderson University is a private Christian university in Anderson, South Carolina. It offers bachelor's, master's, and doctoral degrees in over 100 areas of study. Anderson is affiliated with the South Carolina Baptist Convention and is accredited by the Commission on Colleges of the Southern Association of Colleges and Schools. Anderson participates in NCAA Division II athletics and is a member of the South Atlantic Conference.

Reestablished in 1911 as Anderson College, it is the successor to Johnson University, which was founded in 1848 by W. B. Johnson. Anderson was initially a female college until 1931 when it became coed; in 2006 it was renamed Anderson University. It consists of eleven distinct colleges and schools.

History

Origin
Anderson University was founded in 1848 as Johnson Female Seminary  located in Anderson, South Carolina. It founders, citizens of Anderson, were Daniel Brown, J.P. Reed, and Stephen McCulley. Johnson Female Seminary was named for the Rev. William Bullein Johnson, an early Baptist statesman, a founder and first Vice President of the South Carolina Baptist Convention, and the first president of the Southern Baptist Convention. The seminary was later renamed Johnson University. Rev. William Bullein Johnson served as the first chancellor of Johnson University. By 1857 Johnson University had around 600 students taking courses in calculus, Latin, and Greek. In 1858 Johnson's health declined and in 1862 he died. Johnson's home still stands in Anderson and his portrait hangs in perpetuity in the Truett Cathy Old Common Room in Merritt Hall on the Anderson University campus. Johnson was buried in the cemetery of the First Baptist Church of Anderson.

The university closed its doors due to the combined impact of Johnson's death and the onset of the Civil War. The main building of Johnson University became a Confederate treasury and printing press during the civil war until 1865 when Union forces occupied the building. After the war the Carolina Collegiate Institute and Patrick Military Institute used the buildings of the seminary for educational purposes until 1920. The buildings of Johnson University were then demolished around 1920.

Anderson College

Shortly after the turn of the century, those who fondly remembered the impact that Johnson University had on the region developed a compelling vision of resurrecting the institution in the form of Anderson College in 1911. The name Anderson comes from Robert Anderson an American Revolutionary War veteran and the namesake of Anderson, South Carolina. The Anderson Chamber of Commerce raised $100,000 and secured  for the new campus. The land and funds were given to the South Carolina Baptist State Convention to establish the college. The Merritt Administration Building was the first building constructed on the land. For a time this was the only building dedicated to academics. It would eventually house only the president's office and the Merritt Theatre.

At the outset there were financial problems until Annie Denmark became president in 1929. Denmark became the first female college president in South Carolina. Denmark's inauguration as president on February 14, 1929, established the tradition for Anderson College as Founder's Day celebrating the day of chartering the institution.

In 1931 Anderson College became a coeducational junior college. In the 1990s Anderson returned to its status and offerings as a four-year institution.

Anderson University
Anderson College was renamed Anderson University in 2006. On the occasion of the first commencement as Anderson University, S. Truett Cathy, founder of Chick-fil-A, and his son Dan Cathy received honorary degrees from Anderson University for "exemplifying the character and vision Christian businessmen should possess". In June 2011 Anderson University became the host of the Palmetto Boys State. The following year, the university joined the University Center of Greenville (UCG).

The university opened a new 60,000 square foot library in 2006. Five new residence halls were constructed and two 600-bed student townhome complexes have been established. A new 90,000 square foot student center was opened in fall 2016. A new outdoor stadium and related facilities are under construction, with four of six major projects completed - a new track center, a turfed practice field, a soccer and lacrosse fieldhouse, and a turfed multi-sport field has been installed. Presently under construction is a 50,000 square foot football operations center and an additional practice field.

Campus

Most of the buildings on the main campus are red brick, built throughout the 20th century in the Georgian architectural style. The Merritt Administration Building, Denmark Hall, and Pratt Hall were the original buildings on the Anderson University campus, being built at the time of the university's founding in 1911. One of the main  educational facilities at the heart of campus, Watkins Hall, was dedicated in 1967. Other marked points of interest include the Sullivan Music Building, and the Abney Athletic Center.

The front lawn is called "Alumni Lawn" (sometimes referred to as the "Sacred Six" acres) of Anderson University and is heavily wooded with large oak trees, as is the interior of the main campus which is landscaped in a series of rising terraces. Alumni Lawn and many early buildings are listed on the National Register of Historic Places as the Anderson College Historic District.

In 2008, the university purchased the nearby Anderson County Fairgrounds comprising 77 acres, and simultaneously accepted a gift of 125 adjacent acres on the Rocky River from benefactors John and Marie Pracht.  These acquisitions quadrupled the campus acreage from 68 to 270.  The Fairgrounds property is being transformed into the university's Athletic Campus.  Facilities include a swimming pool, tennis center, softball stadium, soccer stadium, intramural gymnasium, and practice fields with plans for the addition of a baseball stadium, track, fitness center and field house, and athletic administration facility.  The Pracht property includes 40 acres of healthy wetlands.  Subsequently, the university joined with other wetlands property owners to form the Rocky River Conservancy.  The combined properties are being developed into a protected ecological park with trails, boardwalks, and discovery center.  The university has reserved a portion of the Pracht property uplands for future development.

Anderson University created a special partnership in 2012 which operates within the former Duke Energy Service Center which is approximately one mile from the main campus and which was a partial gift to the university from the former Duke Energy Carolinas (now Duke Energy Progress).  The facility is the home of the university's graduate program in criminal justice otherwise known as the Command College of South Carolina.  The facility also houses undergraduate criminal justice programs.

In 2013, the university acquired the first floor of the historic Chiquola building in downtown Anderson, less than a mile from the main campus.  The 11,000 square foot facility is a multi-purpose space for the university's graphic design degree program, student activities, and a center for the study and practice of entrepreneurship.  The facility features three storefront retail spaces in which student-initiated and run businesses will operate.

The Anderson University year-round student population stands at approximately 4,121 students, with a student to faculty ratio of 17:1. Of those, about 3,200 students are traditional undergrads, while the remainder are graduate students.

Academics

College of Arts and Sciences

Undergraduate programs under the College of Arts and Science consist of biochemistry, biology, communication, creative writing, English literature, history, liberal studies, mathematics, political science, psychology, and Spanish. The program challenges students to critical thinking, communication, and rhetoric. The Center for Undergraduate Cancer Research is also part of the college and was established in 2009 to facilitate undergraduate research in search of a cure for cancers. Working under the direction of full-time faculty, students conduct studies and publish results.  The center is located on the nearby campus of AnMed Health Medical Center.

College of Business
The College of Business conducts undergraduate and graduate programs. Undergraduate programs consist of business administration, accounting, human resource administration, and marketing.

College of Christian Studies
The College of Christian Studies comprises undergraduate degree programs and graduate programs through its Clamp Divinity School. 

Undergraduate programs include Bachelor of Arts and the online Bachelor of Christian Studies.

The Clamp Divinity School (originally Clamp Graduate School of Christian Ministry was launched in 2009 and renamed in 2014); offers graduate degree programs:  Master of Divinity (M.Div.), Master of Ministry (M.Min.), Master of Ministry Management (M.M.M.), Master of Arts in Biblical and Theological Studies (M.A.B.T.S.), Doctor of Ministry, and the Doctor of Philosophy in Leadership (ministry track). The purpose of the Clamp school is to offer training in ministry in preparation for leading churches. The school is named after David T. Clamp who contributed an $8 million naming gift in 2008.

College of Education
The College of Education prepares students to become public educators with Judeo-Christian values. Undergraduate programs consists of early childhood education, elementary education and secondary education. Upon completion of the undergraduate program the teacher licensure can be initiated through South Carolina Department of Education. The graduate program in education prepares teachers to become principals or certified teachers. The Teaching Fellows program of the College of Education annually sends students to teach in China and host a storytelling event on campus. Up to $6,000 in annual scholarships are provided under the Teaching Fellows program for students planning to teach in South Carolina.

College of Engineering
In 2020, the university's board of trustees established a college of engineering which will offer majors beginning fall 2021 in electrical, mechanical, and computer engineering.

College of Health Professions
The School of Nursing, School of Physical Therapy, School of Allied Health, and the School of Human Performance comprise the College of Health Professions. The schools offer undergraduate programs in nursing, kinesiology, and human services. Graduate programs are offered in nursing (MSN and DNP) and physical therapy (DPT). The Center for Medical Simulations offers realistic experience for students in nursing or physical therapy. The Center provides human-scale replicas of patients that simulate a variety of conditions.

Johnny Mann Center for Commercial Music
The Johnny Mann Center is the home of The South Carolina School of the Arts' degree program in commercial music. Commercial music at Anderson University includes pop, rock, jazz, bluegrass, and country music genres.  The center also serves as a library for a number of Mann's musical arrangements, compositions, and memorabilia.
The Mann Center is named for the two-time Grammy Award-winning American arranger, composer, conductor, entertainer, and Grammy Award winning recording artist, Johnny Mann (John Russell Mann).  As bandleader with the Johnny Mann Singers, the group recorded approximately three dozen albums, hosted the TV series titled Stand Up and Cheer (1971–1974), and was the musical director for The Joey Bishop Show.

School of Interior Design
The School of Interior Design is one of only nine such programs offered at Christian colleges and universities in the United States that offers a Bachelor of Interior Design. The undergraduate program prepares students to become a designer in many settings such as in an architectural firm or interior design firm.

School of Public Service and Administration
The School of Public Service and Administration educates law enforcement officers, private investigators, federal agents and prospective law students. The school also offers programs in emergency management. Undergraduate programs prepares students for the local, state and federal law enforcement, corrections and emergency response. The graduate program in criminal justice prepares those experienced in law enforcement to advance their careers into management or senior-executive positions with a commitment to Christian values.

The South Carolina School of the Arts

In 2013, the College of Visual and Performing Arts was re-organized as The South Carolina School of the Arts, in recognition of its history of national awards and its vision to place focused attention on the professional preparation of graduates for competitive artistic performance and production roles.  The School emphasizes a hybrid liberal arts-conservatory instructional approach.  Degree programs and emphases within the School include Bachelor of Arts, Bachelor of Fine Arts, Bachelor of Music, Bachelor of Music Education, and Master of Music Education. The School is housed primarily within the Rainey Fine Arts Center which features a 1,000-seat performance hall, a 225-seat recital hall, a 125-seat black box theatre, numerous music and art studios, and an art gallery.  The School also has an additional art gallery within Thrift Library, and additional graphic design facilities off-campus on the court square in downtown Anderson.

Athletics

Nicknamed the Trojans, Anderson competes in NCAA Division II athletics as a member of the South Atlantic Conference. Anderson announced the addition of football starting in the 2024 season.

Men's Sports
 Baseball
 Basketball
 Cross Country
 Golf
 Soccer
 Tennis
 Track & Field
 Lacrosse
 Football (beginning fall 2024)

Women's Sports
 Basketball
 Cross Country
 Golf
 Soccer
 Softball
 Tennis
 Track & Field
 Volleyball
 Lacrosse

Notable alumni
 Thomas C. Alexander, member of the South Carolina Senate, Chairman of the Senate General Committee
 James Lee Barrett, Tony Award-winning writer
 Trey Britton, professional basketball player
 Timothy M. Cain, District Judge on the United States District Court for the District of South Carolina
 Leigh Cappillino, singer, in the multiple Dove Award-winning contemporary Christian music group Point of Grace
 Sue Monk Kidd, New York Times Bestselling author of The Secret Life of Bees, The Mermaid Chair, and The Invention of Wings
 Adam Minarovich, film director and actor
 Rob Stanifer, former Major League Baseball player for the Florida Marlins, Boston Red Sox, and the Hiroshima Toyo Carp
 A.J. Styles, TNA and WWE professional wrestler
 Erskine Thomason, former Major League Baseball player for the Philadelphia Phillies
 James Michael Tyler, actor

References

External links
 Official website
 Official athletics website

 
1911 establishments in South Carolina
Anderson, South Carolina
Baptist Christianity in South Carolina
Buildings and structures in Anderson County, South Carolina
Council for Christian Colleges and Universities
Education in Anderson County, South Carolina
Educational institutions established in 1911
National Register of Historic Places in Anderson County, South Carolina
Universities and colleges accredited by the Southern Association of Colleges and Schools
Universities and colleges affiliated with the Southern Baptist Convention
Private universities and colleges in South Carolina
University and college buildings on the National Register of Historic Places in South Carolina